"When Will I Be Loved" is a popular song written by Phil Everly of the Everly Brothers, who had a US top-ten hit with it in 1960. Linda Ronstadt covered the song in 1975, and her version was an even bigger hit in the US, peaking at No. 2. Vince Gill also covered it in 1994 on the soundtrack of the film 8 Seconds.

The Everly Brothers version

Background
The Everly Brothers scored a number 8 hit single with "When Will I Be Loved" in the summer of 1960 on the Billboard Hot 100 chart. The track had been recorded in 1960 while the duo were contracted to Cadence Records; they moved to Warner Brothers and rerecorded it in a more mainstream pop/rock style. The belated release by Cadence of "When Will I Be Loved" provided the Everly Brothers with a final rockabilly-style hit.

Personnel
The session, produced by Archie Bleyer, took place on February 18, 1960, at the RCA Studio in Nashville.  Those present at the session included:

 Don Everly – guitar, vocals
 Phil Everly – guitar, vocals
 Chet Atkins, guitar 
 Hank Garland, guitar  
 Luther Brandon, guitar
 Lightnin Chance, bass
 Buddy Harman, drums 
 Floyd Cramer, piano

Chart performance

Weekly charts

Year-end charts

Linda Ronstadt version

Background
The song had its highest profile when Linda Ronstadt covered it on her album Heart Like A Wheel. This version (which is technically a group vocal with Ronstadt, Kenny Edwards, and a then-up-and-coming singer/songwriter, Andrew Gold) rearranges the verses of the Everly Brothers original, transposing the first and fourth verses. Capitol Records was reportedly unsure whether to release "When Will I Be Loved" or "You're No Good" as the lead 45 off of Heart Like a Wheel, finally deciding to issue "You're No Good" as the premier single. "When Will I Be Loved" was issued as the second single in March 1975.

The song hit number 2 on the Billboard Hot 100 in June of that year, as well as number 1 in Cash Box; only the chart dominance of the year's biggest hit, "Love Will Keep Us Together" by Captain & Tennille, prevented Ronstadt from having consecutive number 1 hit singles on the Hot 100. Billboard did afford a number 1 ranking to "When Will I Be Loved" on its C&W chart. The song has sold 268,000 copies in the United States since becoming available for digital download as of January 2020.

As Ronstadt's "When Will I Be Loved" descended the charts, its B-side, a remake of Buddy Holly's "It Doesn't Matter Anymore", garnered enough airplay to chart at number 47 Pop, number 20 Adult Contemporary, and number 54 Country.

Charts

Weekly charts

Year-end charts

Little River Band version

Australian band Little River Band released a version in June 1989 as the only single from the rarities compilation album Too Late to Load. The song peaked at number 169 on the ARIA Charts.

Track listing
 Australian 7" (Capitol Records - CP 1895)
A. "When Will I Be Loved" - 2:50
B. "D" - 3:03

Charts

References

1960 songs
1960 singles
1975 singles
1989 singles
2009 singles
Songs written by Phil Everly
The Everly Brothers songs
Linda Ronstadt songs
Little River Band songs
Cashbox number-one singles
Song recordings produced by Peter Asher
Cadence Records singles
Capitol Records singles
EMI Records singles